Catherine Garceau (born July 1, 1978 in Montreal, Quebec) is a Canadian competitor in synchronized swimming and Olympic medalist.

She participated on the Canadian team that received a bronze medal in synchronized team at the 2000 Summer Olympics in Sydney, Australia.

In 2012, Garceau authored "Swimming Out of Water," which was published by Morgan James Publishing.

External links
Olympic Info

1978 births
Canadian synchronized swimmers
French Quebecers
Living people
Olympic bronze medalists for Canada
Olympic synchronized swimmers of Canada
Swimmers from Montreal
Synchronized swimmers at the 2000 Summer Olympics
Olympic medalists in synchronized swimming
Medalists at the 2000 Summer Olympics